A list of films produced in Hong Kong in 1950:.

1950

References

External links
 IMDB list of Hong Kong films
 Hong Kong films of 1950 at HKcinemamagic.com

1950
Hong Kong
Films